The counting board is the precursor of the abacus, and the earliest known form of a counting device (excluding fingers and other very simple methods). Counting boards were made of stone or wood, and the counting was done on the board with beads, or pebbles etc. Not many boards survive because of the perishable materials used in their construction.

The oldest known counting board, the Salamis Tablet was discovered on the Greek island of Salamis in 1899.  It is thought to have been used as more of a gaming board than a calculating device. It is marble, about 150 x 75 x 4.5 cm, and is in the Epigraphical Museum in Athens.  It has carved Greek letters and parallel grooves.

In the novel Wolf Hall, Hilary Mantel refers to Thomas Cromwell using a counting board in 16th-century England.

See also
 Abacus
 Calculator

References

Mathematical tools